School District #145 is a public school district serving the communities of Alvo, Eagle, Prairie Home, Walton, and Waverly in  Nebraska, United States. The district provides primary and secondary education for over 2000 students in grades K-12. The district is governed by a six-member community-elected board, and the current superintendent is Cory Worrell.

Attendance area
Within Lancaster County, the district includes Waverly, Prairie Home, and Walton, as well as small sections of Lincoln.

Within Saunders County, it serves Alvo and Eagle.

Within Otoe County the district includes most of Woodland Hills.

The district extends into Saunders County.

Schools
Elementary schools (K-5)
 Eagle Elementary School
 Hamlow Elementary School
 Waverly Intermediate School

Middle schools (6-8)
 Waverly Middle School

High schools (9-12)
 Waverly High School

References

External links
 School District 145

School districts in Nebraska
Education in Cass County, Nebraska
Education in Lancaster County, Nebraska
Education in Otoe County, Nebraska
Education in Saunders County, Nebraska
Eastern Midlands Conference
Education in Lincoln, Nebraska